Millionär may refer to:

"Millionär", a song by Die Prinzen
The Millionaire (calculator), marketed as Millionär in German-speaking countries
 "Millionär", a song by Farid Bang

See also 
 Millionaire